Saliyeh (also Romanized as Şalīyʿeh) is a village in Mollasani Rural District, in the Central District of Bavi County, Khuzestan Province, Iran. At the 2006 census, its population was 536, in 101 families.

References 

Populated places in Bavi County